Emmanuel Maduwike is an Anglican bishop in Nigeria.

Maduwike was consecrated the Bishop of Ikeduru on the 14 July 2009 at St. Mathew's Cathedral.

Notes

Living people
Anglican bishops of Ikeduru
21st-century Anglican bishops in Nigeria
Year of birth missing (living people)